Soul of a Man is a 2006 R&B album by Eric Burdon. It is dedicated to Ray Charles, John Lee Hooker and the city of New Orleans. It follows his 2004 comeback album My Secret Life and the 2005 live album & DVD Athens Traffic Live.

It reached No. 43 on the German and No. 165 on the French album chart.

The album was recorded within one week. The cover was drawn by a fan.

The song "Feeling Blue" was written by Eric Bibb. "Slow Moving Train" is a song he first performed in early 2005. It's dedicated to U.S. President John F. Kennedy. In 2008 he wanted to shoot a video of it, which never was done yet. Burdon also covered two songs by the folk-singer-songwriter David Munyon; "GTO" features a bass solo and a spoken intro and "Never Give Up Blues" shows him in melancholy.

Track listing 
 "Soul of a Man" (Blind Willie Johnson) – 4:16
 "Kingsize Jones" (Jimmy Wood, J.J. Holliday) – 3:34
 "Red Cross Store" (Fred McDowell) – 4:18
 "Como Se Llama Mama" (Gregg Sutton, John Heron) – 3:39
 "Forty Days and Forty Nights" (Bernard Roth)– 3:00
 "Feeling Blue" (Eric Bibb, Fredrik Boström)– 4:48
 "Never Give Up Blues" (David Munyon) – 4:13
 "GTO" (David Munyon) – 5:33
 "Forty-Four" (Roosevelt Sykes, Eurreal Wilford Montgomery)– 4:30
 "Slow Moving Train" (John Keller) – 5:26
 "Don't Ever Let Nobody Drag Your Spirit Down" (Charlotte Hoglund, Eric Bibb) – 4:55
 "Devil Run" (John Bundrick) – 3:21
 "I Don't Mind" (John Bundrick) – 5:27
 "Circuit Rider" (Billy Watts, David Raven, Pete Anderson, Taras Prodaniuk) – 3:44

Personnel 
 Eric Burdon - vocals
 Carl Carlton - guitar, slide guitar
 Johnny Lee Schell - guitar, slide guitar, background vocals
 Jon Cleary - piano
 James "Hutch" Hutchinson - bass guitar
 Reggie McBride - bass guitar
 Les Lovett - trumpet, Flugelhorn
 Nick Love - trombone
 John Sublett - saxophone
 Rod Piazza - harmonica
 Lenny Castro - percussion
 Tony Braunagel - drums

References

2006 albums
Soul albums by British artists
Eric Burdon albums
Funk albums by British artists
SPV/Steamhammer albums